The Black Label Bike Club (BLBC) is an international freak/mutant bicycle organization specializing in tall bikes and choppers.

History 
BLBC was founded in 1992 as the country's first "outlaw bike club" by Jacob Houle and Per Hanson, under the name "Hard Times Bike Club", in Minneapolis, Minnesota. Inspired by Victorians who used tall bikes, called lamplighters, to light the street lamps, BLBC are credited as the originators of tall bike jousting, and one of the main contributors to the rise of the tall bike culture. The club has since grown to include chapters in New York City, Reno, Nevada, Austin, Texas, Oakland, California, Stockholm and Malmö in Sweden, New Orleans, Louisiana, and a nomad chapter known as "Nowhere".

Media 
The New York chapter was featured in a full-length film titled B.I.K.E., produced by Fountainhead Films in 2006. The film was directed by Anthony Howard and Jacob Septimus, who spent over two years following the club by going to their parties in New York and Minneapolis, as well as the protests of the 2004 Republican National Convention.

In 2018, photographer Julie Glassberg published a photography book documenting the Black Label Bike Club's New York chapter. The book is named after BLBC's annual event, Bike Kill.

References

External links
 Photo Essay in Chief Magazine of the group's annual Bike Kill event, featuring a video of "bike jousting"
 B.I.K.E. the Movie
 B.I.K.E. the Movie on Vimeo

Cycling clubs
1992 establishments in Minnesota
Vehicle modification